Uchu Sentai Kyuranger is a 2017 Japanese television series, and is the 41st entry of the long-running Super Sentai series produced by TV Asahi and Toei Company. Taking place in the late 21st century, the series follows a team of alien warriors chosen by the constellations to fight Jark Matter, an evil organization that has taken over the galaxy.

Episodes
The episodes are denominated "Spaces", according to the series' space motif.

References

External links
 for TV Asahi
 for Toei Company

Uchu Sentai Kyuranger